Tugboat Emily B was owned by the Wilmington Towing Company, Wilmington, North Carolina, and was loaned to the US Navy in 1918 for use as  during World War I. She was returned to her owners at the end of the war.

References 

Tugs of the United States Navy